Athearnia is a genus of freshwater snails with a gill and an operculum, aquatic gastropod mollusks in the family Pleuroceridae.

Species
Species within the genus Athearnia include:
 Athearnia anthonyi
 Athearnia crassa, the boulder snail

References

 Zipcode zoo info at: 

Pleuroceridae

pt:Athearnia anthonyi